Nebria ingens is a species of ground beetle in the Nebriinae subfamily that is endemic to the US state of California.

References

ingens
Beetles described in 1870
Beetles of North America
Endemic fauna of California
Fauna without expected TNC conservation status